The 2015 Netball Superleague Grand Final featured Surrey Storm and Hertfordshire Mavericks. Having previously played each other in 2011 this was the second grand final featuring both teams. Mavericks won the 2011 encounter. This was also Surrey Storm's fourth grand final appearance in five years. Storm beat Hertfordshire Mavericks 56–39 to win their first Superleague title. Storm led from the first quarter and, with a dominant display in attack from Player of the Match, Pamela Cookey, they eventually pulled seventeen points clear of the Mavericks.

Route to the Final

Match summary

References

2015 Netball Superleague season
2015
Surrey Storm matches
Mavericks Netball matches
Netball Superleague